Calumpang is one of the barangays of Marikina. It is bounded to the north by Barangay Tanong, west by Barangay Barangka, south by Santolan, Pasig and east by Barangay San Roque.  It is named after a wild almond, Sterculia foetida.

Place of interest

Community facilities
Kalumpang Barangay Hall
Kalumpang Health Center
Kalumpang Gym
Kalumpang Multipurpose Hall
Kalumpang Police Station
Kalumpang Learning Center

Landmarks and buildings
SM City Marikina
Marikina River Park
Santolan station
BFCT East Transport Terminal
Handog Center

Schools
Kalumpang Elementary School
Kalumpang National High School
APEC Schools
Jesus Flock Academy Foundation, Inc.
Sta. Clara Academy
Bright Star Learning Center

Churches
San Antonio de Padua Parish
Iglesia ni Cristo
Ang Dating Daan

Roads and bridges
 Marcos Highway Bridge
 Diosdado Macapagal Bridge (C5-Marcos Highway Bridge)
 Line 2 Bridge
 Marcos Highway

References

Barangays of Metro Manila
Marikina